Prof. Basappa Krishnappa (1938–1997) was one of the pioneers of the Dalit literary movement in Kannada and the founder president of Dalit Sangarsha Samiti, later it is named as (Karnataka Dalita Sangharsha samiti) the radical Dalit advocacy group. He taught at the Sir M. Vishweshwariah College in Bhadravathi for thirty years before retiring as principal. He is acknowledged as an important literary critic in Kannada.

Early life
Krishnappa was born in Madiga Community, in Harihara,  Davangere District to Dasappala Basappa and Chowdamma.

Movement
A social revolutionary, Krishnappa's presence is felt in most of the landmark Dalit struggles of Karnataka, especially those aimed at getting land for Dalits and fighting for Dalit women's self-respect.

B. Krishnappa, along with Siddalingaiah, K. B. Siddaiah and others, was one of the founders of Dalita Sangharsha Samiti.

References

Further reading 
 Satyanarayana, K & Tharu, Susie (2011) No Alphabet in Sight: New Dalit Writing from South Asia, Dossier 1: Tamil and Malayalam, New Delhi: Penguin Books.
 Satyanarayana, K & Tharu, Susie (2013) From those Stubs Steel Nibs are Sprouting: New Dalit Writing from South Asia, Dossier 2: Kannada and Telugu, New Delhi: HarperCollins India.

Dalit writers
Dalit leaders
Dalit activists
Dalit politicians
Activists from Karnataka
Kannada-language writers
1938 births
1997 deaths
20th-century Indian lawyers
Writers from Karnataka
People from Davanagere district